is a former Japanese football player.

Playing career

Club statistics

References

External links

1980 births
Living people
Association football people from Kanagawa Prefecture
Japanese footballers
J1 League players
J2 League players
Shonan Bellmare players
Mito HollyHock players
Vegalta Sendai players
Sagan Tosu players
Association football defenders